Brazil competed at the 2002 Winter Olympics in Salt Lake City, United States.

Alpine skiing

Men

Women

Bobsleigh

Men

Cross-country skiing

Men

C = Classical style, F = Freestyle

Women

C = Classical style, F = Freestyle

Luge

Men

References
Official Olympic Reports
 Olympic Winter Games 2002, full results by sports-reference.com

Nations at the 2002 Winter Olympics
2002 Winter Olympics
Winter Olympics